Vyacheslav Vyacheslavovich Ivanov (born 31 December 1987 in Mariupol, Donetsk Oblast) is a Ukrainian football midfielder currently playing for Ukrainian Second League club Kremin.

Club history
Ivanov began his football career in CYSS Shakhtar in Donetsk. He signed with FC Kremin Kremenchuk during 2009 summer transfer window.

Career statistics

References

External links
  Profile – Official Kremin site
  FC Kremin Kremenchuk Squad on the PFL website
  Profile on the FFU website

1987 births
Ukrainian footballers
FC Kremin Kremenchuk players
Sportspeople from Mariupol
Living people
Association football midfielders
21st-century Ukrainian people